The Prémio Autores are awards presented annually by the Sociedade Portuguesa de Autores since 2010.

Ceremonies
1st: 28 February
2nd: 21 February
3rd: 27 February
4th: 25 February
5th: 8 May

Categories

Visual arts
Best Photographic Work
Best Plastic Arts Exhibition
Best Scenographic Work

Dance
Best Choreography

Radio
Best Radio Program

Television
Best Entertainment Program
Best Fiction Program
Best Information Program

Film
Best Screenplay
Best Actress
Best Actor
Best Film

Music
Best Song
Best Erudite Music Work
Best Album

Theatre
Best Performed Portuguese Text
Best Show
Best Actress
Best Actor

Literature
Best Children's and Juvenile Book
Best Poetry Book
Best Narrative Fiction Book

See also

 List of European art awards

References

2010 establishments in Portugal
Annual events in Portugal
Arts awards in Portugal
Awards established in 2010
Dance awards
Portuguese awards
Portuguese film awards
Portuguese literary awards
Portuguese music awards
Portuguese television awards
Portuguese theatre awards
Radio awards